Shéridan Esterfany Oliveira de Anchieta (born April 11, 1984) is a Brazilian politician and psychologist. Shéridan was the wife of the former governor of Roraima, José de Anchieta Júnior and served as Secretary of Human Promotion and Development in his government. In 2014, she was elected federal deputy with the highest vote of her state.

References

1984 births
Living people
People from Boa Vista, Roraima
Members of the Chamber of Deputies (Brazil) from Roraima
Brazilian Social Democracy Party politicians
Brazilian women in politics